The Altenberg Workshops in Theoretical Biology are expert meetings focused on a key issue of biological theory, hosted by the Konrad Lorenz Institute for Evolution and Cognition Research (KLI) since 1996. The workshops are organized by leading experts in their field, who invite a group of international top level scientists as participants for a 3-day working meeting in the Lorenz Mansion at Altenberg near Vienna, Austria. By this procedure the KLI intends to generate new conceptual advances and research initiatives in the biosciences, which, due to their explicit interdisciplinary nature, are attractive to a wide variety of scientists from practically all fields of biology and the neighboring disciplines.

Workshops and their topics
Cultural Niche Construction. Organized by Kevin Laland and Mike O´Brien. September 2011
Strategic Interaction in Humans and Other Animals. Organized by Simon Huttegger and Brain Skyrms. September 2011
The Meaning of "Theory" in Biology. Organized by Massimo Pigliucci, Kim Sterelny, and Werner Callebaut. June 2011
Biological and Physical Constraints on the Evolution of Form in Plants and Animals. Organized by Jeffrey H. Schwartz and Bruno Maresca. September 2010
Scaffolding in Evolution, Culture, and Cognition. Organized by Linnda Caporael, James Griesemer, and William Wimsatt. July 2010
Models of Man for Evolutionary Economics. Organized by Werner Callebaut, Christophe Heintz, and Luigi Marengo. September 2009
Human EvoDevo: The Role of Development in Human Evolution. Organized by Philipp Gunz and Philipp Mitteroecker. September 2009
Origins of EvoDevo - A tribute to Pere Alberch. Organized by Gerd B. Müller and Diego Rasskin-Gutman. September 2008
Measuring Biology - Quantitative Methods: Past and Future. Organized by Fred L. Bookstein and Katrin Schäfer. September 2008
Toward an Extended Evolutionary Synthesis Organized by Massimo Pigliucci and Gerd B. Müller. July 2008
Innovation in Cultural Systems - Contributions from Evolutionary Anthropology. Organized by Michael J. O´Brien and Stephen J. Shennan. September 2007
The Major Transitions Revisited. Organized by Brett Calcott and Kim Sterelny. July 2007
Comparative Philosophy of Technical Artifacts and Biological Organisms. Organized by Ulrich Krohs and Peter Kroes. September 2006
The New Cognitive Sciences - Bringing Evolution and Development to Bear on Mind and Brain. Organized by Lynn Nadel, Mary Peterson, and Luca Tommasi. June 2006
Arriving at a Theoretical Biology - The Waddington Centennial. Organized by Manfred Laubichler and Brian K. Hall. September 2005
The Evolution of Communicative Creativity - From Fixed Signals to Contextual Flexibility. Organized by D. Kimbrough Oller and Ulrike Griebel. July 2005
Analog Communication - Evolution, Brain Mechanisms, Dynamics, Simulation. Organized by Karl Grammer and Astrid Juette. September 2004
Modeling Biology - Structures, Behavior, Evolution. Organized by Luciano da Fontoura Costa and Gerd B. Müller. July 2004
Viennese Roots of Theoretical Biology - The Vivarium Centenary. Organized by Manfred Laubichler, Gerd B. Müller, and Werner Callebaut. September 2002
Biological Information Beyond Metaphor. Organized by Werner Callebaut. July 2002
Evolution of Communication Systems. Organized by D. Kimbrough Oller and Ulrike Griebel. October 2001
Environment, Development, and Evolution. Organized by Brian Hall, Roy Pearson, and Gerd B. Müller. July 2001
Modularity - Understanding the Development and Evolution of Complex Natural Systems. Organized by Werner Callebaut and Diego Rasskin-Guttman. October 2000
Origins of Organismal Form - Beyond the Gene Paradigm Organized by Gerd B. Müller and Stuart Newman. October 1999
Evolution of Cognition. Organized by Cecilia Heyes, Ludwig Huber, and Adolf Heschl. August 1998
Evolutionary Naturalism - Bioepistemology and the Challenge of Development and Sociality. Organized by Werner Callebaut and Karola Stotz. June 1997
The Emergence and Evolution of Organization.  Organized by Walter Fontana, Gerd B. Müller and Günter Wagner. September 1996

External links
Altenberg Workshops in Theoretical Biology
Vienna Series in Theoretical Biology

Meetings
Mathematical and theoretical biology